HMS Scorpion was a river gunboat of the Royal Navy constructed in 1938. Built at Whites in Cowes, launched on 20 December 1937 and completed in November 1938, she served on the China Station during the Second World War. She was sunk on 13 February North of the Banka Straits by the Japanese cruiser Yura and the destroyers Fubuki and Asagiri.

References 

1937 ships